Monochamus sartor is a species of beetle in the family Cerambycidae. It was first described by Johan Christian Fabricius in 1787, under the genus Lamia. It is known from throughout Europe, as well as in Kazakhstan, Mongolia, North Korea and South Korea. It is rated by the IUCN as Least Concern.

Subspecies
 Monochamus sartor urussovii (Fischer von Waldheim, 1806) - fir sawyer beetle
 Monochamus sartor sartor (Fabricius, 1787) - sawyer beetle

References

sartor
Beetles described in 1787